Somalia competed in the Olympic Games for the first time at the 1972 Summer Olympics in Munich, West Germany.

Athletics

Men

Field events

Key
Note–Ranks given for track events are within the athlete's heat only
Q = Qualified for the next round
q = Qualified for the next round as a fastest loser or, in field events, by position without achieving the qualifying target
NR = National record
N/A = Round not applicable for the event
Bye = Athlete not required to compete in round

References
Official Olympic Reports

Nations at the 1972 Summer Olympics
1972
1972 in Somalia